Hämeenlinnan Tarmo is a sports club founded in Hämeenlinna, Finland, in 1903. It currently has about 1500 members. The club participates in athletics, cycling, strength sports, bowling, orienteering, and volleyball. The president of the club is Kalevi Kilpi.

Up to the 1970s, the club also participated in ice hockey, where its local opponents were HPK and Tiikerit, also known as HT-85, which later moved to field hockey.

Accomplishments in ice hockey
 Gold medal in Finnish championships 1948, 1949
 Silver medal in Finnish championships 1945, 1946, 1947, 1950, 1951, 1953, 1956
 Bronze medal in Finnish championships 1952, 1958

External links
 Official website

Sports teams in Finland
Hämeenlinna
Sports clubs established in 1903
1903 establishments in Finland